The 1999–2000 Slovenian Second League season started on 15 August 1999 and ended on 4 June 2000. Each team played a total of 30 matches.

League standing

See also
1999–2000 Slovenian PrvaLiga
1999–2000 Slovenian Third League

References

External links
Football Association of Slovenia 

Slovenian Second League seasons
2
Slovenia